Medak Gulshanabad Division was administratively part of the Hyderabad State was made up of sixteen districts. Gulshanabad was one of four divisions which included Mahbubnagar district, Medak district, Nalgonda district (Nalgundah), and Nizamabad district.

History
Medak Gulshanabad Division was part of Bidar division, and was formed in 1905.

Districts

 Mahbubnagar district
 Medak district
 Nalgonda district (Nalgundah)
 Nizamabad district

References

Hyderabad State